The Desert's Toll is a 1926 American silent Western film directed by Clifford Smith and starring Kathleen Key, Francis McDonald, and Tom Santschi.

Plot
Frank Darwin (Francis McDonald) needs to convince Muriel (Kathleen Key) he did not kill her Father, as claimed by Jasper (Tom Santschi) and Oneta (Anna May Wong).

Cast

Preservation
A print of The Desert's Toll is preserved in the George Eastman Museum Motion Picture Collection.

References

External links

 

1926 films
1926 Western (genre) films
Metro-Goldwyn-Mayer films
American black-and-white films
[[Category:Films directed by C
lifford Smith]]
1926 drama films
Silent American Western (genre) films
1920s American films
1920s English-language films